Hassop  is a village in the local government district of Derbyshire Dales in Derbyshire, England. It is in the civil parish of Great Longstone

It developed around a number of lead mines, with such names as "The Brightside", "Backdale", "Harry Bruce", "Waterhole" and "Whitecoe", which lasted until the mid-nineteenth century.

The local landowners were the Eyre family of Padley, who built Hassop Hall. In 1643 they defended the house against the Parliamentarians. Manholes in the floor of the cellar  are reputed to allow entrance to a former lead-mine under the Hall. Hassop Hall was extensively rebuilt in Classical style between 1827 and 1833. It is now a private hotel.

The Church of All Saints was built in 1816-18 for the Eyre family.

Hassop railway station was about two miles south of the village, built by the Manchester, Buxton, Matlock and Midlands Junction Railway in 1863. It closed in 1964 and the station building has since been converted to a bookshop and cafe. The trackbed through the station is part of the 8.5 mile Monsal Trail, a walk and cycleway.

See also
Listed buildings in Hassop

References

External links

 Countrybookshop at Hassop Station
 Hassop station website

Villages in Derbyshire
Towns and villages of the Peak District
Derbyshire Dales